Khwaju Kermani (December 1290 – 1349) was a famous Persian poet and Sufi mystic from Iran.

Life

He was born in Kerman, Iran on  24 December 1290. His nickname Khwaju is a diminutive of the Persian word Khwaja which he uses as his poetic penname. This title points to descent from a family of high social status.  The nisba (name title) Morshedi display his association with the Persian Sufi master Shaykh Abu Eshaq Kazeruni, the founder of the Morshediyya order. Khwaju died around 1349 in Shiraz, Iran, and his tomb in Shiraz is a popular tourist attraction today.  When he was young, he visited Egypt, Syria, Jerusalem and Iraq.   He also performed the Hajj in Mecca.  One purpose of his travel is said to have been education and meeting with scholars of other lands.  He composed one of his best known works Homāy o Homāyun in Baghdad.  Returning to Iranian lands in 1335, he strove to find a position as a court poet by dedicating poems to the rulers of his time, such as the Il-Khanid rulers Abu Sa'id Bahadur Khan and Arpa Ke'un, the Mozaffarid Mubariz al-Din Muhammad, and Abu Ishaq Inju of the Inju dynasty.

Works

List of Poems

Divan - a collection of his poems in the form of Ghazals, qasidas, strophic poems, qeṭʾas (occasional verse), and quatrains
Homāy o Homāyun The poem relates the adventures of the Persian prince Homāy, who falls in love with the Chinese princess, Homāyun.
Gol o Nowruz The poem tells another love story, this time vaguely situated in the time shortly before the advent of Islam.
Rowżat-al-anwār In twenty poetic discources, the poet deals with requirements for the mystical path and the ethics of kingship.
Kamāl-nām
Gowhar-nāma
Sām-nāma A heroic epic about the grandfather of Rustam

Translations
Homāy e Homāyun. Un romanzo d'amore e avventura dalla Persia medievale. ed. and trans. by Nahid Norozi, preface by J.C. Buergel, Milano: Mimesis  2011

See also

List of Persian poets and authors
Persian literature
Khwaju Kermani tomb

Notes

Sources 
 Browne, E. G. (1920 [1928]). A Literary History of Persia, vol. 3: The Tartar Dominion (1265–1502). Cambridge.

 Jan Rypka, History of Iranian Literature. Reidel Publishing Company. ASIN B-000-6BXVT-K

External links

 http://www.shirazcity.org/shiraz/Shiraz%20Information/Sightseeing/Khajou%20e.htm

1290 births
1352 deaths
Sufi poets
14th-century Persian-language poets
People from Kerman Province
People from Kerman
Injuid-period poets
Ilkhanate-period poets
14th-century Iranian people